The Dean Bridge spans the Water of Leith in the city of Edinburgh on the A90 road to Queensferry on the Firth of Forth. The bridge was one of the last major works before retirement of the bridge designer, civil engineer Thomas Telford, and was completed in 1831 when he was seventy-three years old.

Before the bridge was built the river had been crossed since medieval times at a ford, later by a single-arch stone bridge near the same spot, at the foot of Bell's Brae in the Dean Village. The private Dean Gardens lie under the east side of the bridge on the north bank of the Water of Leith.

History
The original proposal for a new bridge came from John Learmonth, a former Edinburgh Lord Provost and owner of the Dean estate on the north bank of the river. Following the successful expansion of the New Town on Lord Moray's estate on the south bank, Learmonth wanted to feu his land on the north side to create a further extension, but needed a more convenient link to the town over the gorge at Randolph Cliff, while also providing an impressive approach to his development. Learmonth was prepared to meet the cost himself, estimated at £18,556, but in 1828 the Cramond Road Trustees, responsible for public roads in the district, agreed to part-fund a new bridge on condition that it would be designed by Britain’s foremost bridge builder and be toll-free.

The contract was given to Aberdeen builder, John Gibb, with whom Telford had worked on the building of Aberdeen harbour. Work began in 1829 and was completed by the end of 1831. The stone was brought from Craigleith quarry near the village of Blackhall. Weight and cost were saved by building hollow piers, a feature which facilitates their effective inspection today. The footway was carried on outer segmental arches, the wooden supports of which had to be carefully removed, slowly and evenly, to allow the finished bridge to settle uniformly into its final position.  The resident engineer for the Works was  Charles Atherton, who later acted as resident engineer on Telford's Broomielaw Bridge in Glasgow

The bridge was completed at the end of 1831. Between completion and the contract hand-over date, Gibb had a toll-gate erected at each end of the bridge and charged pedestrians one penny per head to enjoy the view from the structure. The opening date was early in 1832, though the bridge was not opened to horse and cart traffic until May 1834.

Learmonth died in 1858 before completion of most of his envisaged residential development. Owing to a sudden lull in building, Clarendon Crescent was not built until the 1850s, and Buckingham Terrace, Learmonth Terrace and Belgrave Crescent appeared only in the next decade.

In 1888, the Edinburgh Corporation asked the Burgh Engineer John Cooper to recommend measures designed to deter suicides which were occurring from the bridge. As a result, the height of the parapet was raised.

In 1957 the Institution of Civil Engineers, of which Telford was first President, installed a plaque on the east parapet to commemorate his bicentenary. This was subsequently stolen but replaced in 1982.

The bridge is an important location in the novel "The Lewis Man" by Peter May.

References

Bridges by Thomas Telford
Road bridges in Scotland
Viaducts in Scotland
Bridges in Edinburgh
Former toll bridges in Scotland
New Town, Edinburgh
Bridges across the Water of Leith
Bridges completed in 1831
1831 establishments in Scotland